Aigueblanche is a former commune in the Savoie department in the Auvergne-Rhône-Alpes region in south-eastern France. On 1 January 2019, it was merged into the new commune Grand-Aigueblanche.

History

Peter of Aigueblanche (or Peter of Aquablanca; died 27 November 1268) was a medieval Bishop of Hereford. A nobleman from Savoy, he came to England as part of the party accompanying King Henry III's bride Eleanor of Provence. He entered the royal service, becoming bishop in 1241. He then served the king for a number of years as a diplomat, helping to arrange the marriage of Prince Edward. Peter became embroiled in King Henry's attempts to acquire the kingdom of Sicily, and Peter's efforts to raise money towards that goal brought condemnation from the clergy and barons of England. When the barons began to revolt against King Henry in the late 1250s and early 1260s, Peter was attacked and his lands and property pillaged. He was arrested briefly in 1263 by the barons, before being mostly restored to his lands after the Battle of Evesham.

International relations

Aigueblanche is twinned with Villeneuve, Italy.

Population

See also
Communes of the Savoie department

References

External links

Official site

Former communes of Savoie